Shady Grove is a ghost town in Lawrence County, Tennessee, United States. It appeared on USGS maps as late as 1936.

References

Ghost towns in Tennessee
Geography of Lawrence County, Tennessee